Rise and Fall of Idi Amin, also known as Amin: The Rise and Fall, is a 1981 biographical film directed by Sharad Patel and starring Joseph Olita as Idi Amin. Olita also played Amin in the 1991 film Mississippi Masala.

Plot
It details the controversial actions and atrocities of the former dictator of Uganda, Idi Amin Dada, during his violent rise to power in 1971 until his overthrow in 1979 as the result of the Uganda–Tanzania War. Rise and Fall of Idi Amin was a co-production of the United Kingdom, Kenya, and Nigeria, with most of filming done in Kenya, less than a year after Amin's downfall.

Historical accuracy
Despite being branded as an exploitation film, it is reasonably accurate with the facts and dates of the events depicted, including the Israeli raid, the war with Tanzania, and the capture and imprisonment of British journalist Denis Hills (who portrays himself in the film).

Reaction
When released internationally, most of the voices were dubbed because of poor sound production.

The film won five awards, including best actor, at the Las Vegas International Film Festival.

References

External links
 Rise and Fall of Idi Amin at the Internet Movie Database
 

1981 films
British biographical films
Cold War films
1980s exploitation films
Films shot in Kenya
Films set in the 1970s
Films set in Uganda
Cultural depictions of Idi Amin
Nigerian biographical films
Operation Entebbe
War films based on actual events
1980s biographical films
1980s historical films
Films scored by Christopher Gunning
Films about coups d'état
Kenyan drama films
1980s English-language films
English-language Nigerian films
English-language Kenyan films
Nigerian drama films
1980s British films